John Langton (April 7, 1808 – March 19, 1894) was Canada's first Auditor General.

He was born in Ormskirk, Lancashire, England in 1808 and studied at Trinity College, Cambridge. He emigrated to Upper Canada in 1833 and settled near Peterborough. He worked for a time in the timber trade. In 1841, he was elected to the council for the Colborne District, becoming warden in 1848. In 1851, Langton was elected to the Legislative Council for Peterborough; he was reelected in 1854. In 1855, he was appointed the Auditor of the Province of Canada and was also appointed as a member of the newly formed Board of Audit; he resigned his seat in the assembly the following year. He served as Auditor for the remaining tenure of the Province of Canada and the first decade of the Dominion of Canada; it was Langton who led in the production of the first financial statements of the Dominion of Canada in spite of many challenges. He also served on the senate for the University of Toronto Langton moved with the government to Quebec City in 1859 and was president of the Literary and Historical Society of Quebec. After Canadian Confederation in 1867, Langton was appointed the head of the federal Board of Audit. In 1870, he was named Deputy Minister of Finance and Secretary to the Treasury Board, while maintaining his role as Auditor General. The Auditor General's function was later to be separated from the finance department. He retired in 1878. From 1880 to 1882, he served as president of the Canadian Institute.

He died in Toronto in 1894.

References

External links 

Langton (John) Family archival papers held at the University of Toronto Archives and Records Management Services

1808 births
1894 deaths
Members of the Legislative Assembly of the Province of Canada from Canada West
19th-century Canadian civil servants
People from Ormskirk
English emigrants to Canada
Canadian auditors